Double Date is a 1941 American comedy film directed by Glenn Tryon and written by Scott Darling, Erna Lazarus and Agnes Christine Johnston. The film stars Edmund Lowe, Una Merkel, Peggy Moran, Rand Brooks, Tommy Kelly and Hattie Noel. The film was released on March 14, 1941, by Universal Pictures.

Plot
The laugh-provoking efforts of a pert, determined young schoolgirl and a swaggering schoolboy-sophisticate to guide their errant adult relatives away from the pitfalls of love.

Cast        
Edmund Lowe as Roger Baldwin
Una Merkel as Aunt Elsie Kirkland
Peggy Moran as Penelope 'Penny' Kirkland
Rand Brooks as Jerry Baldwin
Tommy Kelly as Hodges 
Hattie Noel as Lilac
Eddy Waller as Truck Driver
William Ruhl as Motorcycle Cop
Sam Flint as Doctor
Pat O'Malley as Policeman
Joey Ray as Orchestra Leader
Charles Smith as Bud 
Nell O'Day as Mary
Janet Warren as Schoolgirl 
Andrew Tombes as Judge Perkins
Joe Downing as Burglar
George Chandler as Attendant
Frank Sully as Hank

References

External links
 

1941 films
American comedy films
1941 comedy films
Universal Pictures films
Films directed by Glenn Tryon
American black-and-white films
1940s English-language films
1940s American films